David L. Pulver (born 2 November 1965 in Kingston, Ontario) is a Canadian freelance writer and game designer, author of more than fifty role-playing game rulebooks and supplements, including the award-winning Transhuman Space.

Early life and education
Pulver has a History BA from Queen's University.

Role-playing game designs
In a 2010 interview, Pulver stated that although he has been doing work for Steve Jackson Games (SJG) "ever since I became a freelance writer," he also worked for TSR, Game Designer's Workshop, West End Games, Iron Crown Enterprises, and White Wolf Publishing, before his significant contribution to the Guardians of Order catalogue. He is a fan of anime and manga.

In 1989 Pulver designed the first version of GURPS Ultra-Tech, an equipment guide that could be used with many different (science fiction) worlds. Pulver contributed adventures to several anthologies published for GURPS, and also designed GURPS Psionics (1991) followed by GURPS Vehicles (1993). The latter featured a mathematically complex vehicle-construction system, allowing the creation of vehicles ranging from a stone-age canoe to faster-than-light starship. This system was later simplified for GURPS Traveller (especially GURPS Traveller: Starships and GURPS Traveller: Ground Forces) and GURPS World War 2 (including GURPS WW2: Motorpool). The design rules in GURPS Robots (1997) and GURPS Mecha (1997) are fully compatible with it. Pulver also produced two original game settings for SJG at this time: GURPS Reign of Steel (1996) and GURPS Technomancer (1998).

In November 1998, fellow Canadian Mark MacKinnon brought Pulver on to Guardians of Order, and Pulver took the lead in extending Big Eyes, Small Mouth from its simple beginnings to become a more complex game, including a skill system and vehicle rules. Pulver also simultaneously worked on more licensed, standalone games, including Dominion: Tank Police (1999), Demon City Shinjuku (2000), and Tenchi Muyo! (2000). With John R. Phythyon, Jr., Pulver also designed the gangster samurai Tri-stat game Ghost Dog (2000), based on the film of the same name. Continuing his interest in science-fiction, he also wrote Centauri Knights (2001), the first original setting from Guardians of Order. Pulver continued to write for Guardians almost to the point when they ceased publication, notably contributing to their anthologies Ex Machina (2004) and Dreaming Cities (2005).

Meanwhile, Pulver continued his 20-year relationship with Steve Jackson Games. He contributed to GURPS Traveller and GURPS World War 2 lines, and created Transhuman Space (2002), a new science fiction setting and game line for GURPS. Pulver assisted Sean Punch with the fourth edition of GURPS beginning in September 2002, and with releases from 2004 to 2009. His vehicle design rules for the 4th edition of GURPS were released in GURPS Spaceships (2007).

Work in other media
Steve Jackson and David Pulver coauthored a novella, Thera Awakening, that was distributed with the Interplay computer game Stonekeep.  This novella describes the backstory and history of the Stonekeep world and characters and was completed before the game was finished.

Pulver was the guest of honor at the 1992 U-Con gaming convention (held annually at the University of Michigan).

Writing credits

GURPS, Third Edition
All-Star Jam 2004
Bio-Tech
Cyberpunk Adventures (winner of the 1992 Origins Award for Best Roleplaying Adventure)
Fantasy Adventures
GURPS Lite for Transhuman Space
Mecha
Psionics
Reign of Steel
Robots
Space Atlas IV
Special Ops, 2nd edition
Technomancer
Time Travel Adventures
Transhuman Space (winner of the 2003 Grog d'Or Award for Best Role-playing Game, Game Line or RPG Setting.)
Deep Beyond
The High Frontier
Traveller Alien Races 1, 2, 3, and 4
Traveller: Ground Forces
Traveller Planetary Survey 6: Darkmoon
Traveller: Star Mercs
Traveller: Starships
Ultra-Tech and Ultra-Tech II
Vehicles 1st and 2nd editions
Vehicles Expansion I
Vehicles Expansion II
Vehicles Lite
Y2K

GURPS , Fourth Edition
GURPS Mass Combat (2009)
GURPS Banestorm: Abydos (2008)
GURPS Basic Set 4th edition
GURPS Bio-Tech 2nd edition
GURPS Spaceships (2007)
GURPS Ultra-Tech 4th edition

Other game systems
Aliens and Artifacts
The Authority Role-Playing Game
Big Eyes, Small Mouth
BESM Dungeon
Big Eyes, Small Mouth (main rulebook) 2nd edition and 3rd editions
Big Robots, Cool Starships
Centauri Knights
Hot Rods and Gun Bunnies
Bubblegum Crisis: Before and After
AD&D 2nd Edition
 The Complete Druid's Handbook
 The Glory of Rome
Cybor Gladiators
d20 System
BESM d20 Role-playing Game
Centauri Knights d20
d20 Mecha
d20 Military Vehicles
Demon City Shinjuku Role-playing Game and Resource Book
Dominion Tank Police Role-playing Game and Resource Book
Dreaming Cities
Escape from Monster Island
Ex Machina
Gamer's Handbook of the Marvel Universe 1992 Character Updates
Ghost Dog Role-Playing Game and Resource Book
Indiana Jones and the Rising Sun
Tenchi Muyo Role-playing Game and Resource Book
Tri-Stat dX core role-playing system

References

External links
 
 
 List of David L. Pulver's books at Google Books
 List of David Pulver's books available as PDF from e23.sjgames.com
 List of David Pulver's books available as books from www.warehouse23.com
 

1965 births
Living people
Canadian game designers
Dungeons & Dragons game designers
GURPS writers
Queen's University at Kingston alumni
Writers from Kingston, Ontario